John Gerard McClean (24 September 1914 – 28 August 1978) was an English prelate of the Roman Catholic Church. He served as Bishop of Middlesbrough from 1967 to 1978.

Born in Redcar, Yorkshire on 24 September 1914, he was ordained to the priesthood on 22 March 1942. He was appointed Coadjutor Bishop of Middlesbrough and Titular Bishop of Maxita on 10 December 1966. His consecration to the Episcopate took place on 24 February 1967, the principal consecrator was Bishop George Brunner of Middlesbrough, and the principal co-consecrators were Bishop James Cunningham of Hexham and Newcastle and Bishop William Wheeler of Leeds. On Bishop Brunner's retirement, McClean automatically succeeded as the Bishop of the Diocese of Middlesbrough on 13 June 1967.

He died in office on 28 August 1978, aged 63.

References

1914 births
1978 deaths
20th-century Roman Catholic bishops in England
People from Redcar
Roman Catholic bishops of Middlesbrough